Mathew Baker (1530–1613) was one of the most renowned Tudor shipwrights, and the first to put the practice of shipbuilding down on paper.

The first list of 'Master Shipwrights' appointed 'by Patent' by Henry VIII of England included 'John Smyth, Robert Holborn, Richard Bull and James Baker,' in 1537. James Baker was responsible for many of the designs and the construction of King Henry's fleet. James designed the means of mounting cannon in a ship's lower levels, rather than on the top deck, an idea credited to King Henry.

Having been apprenticed to his father James, and having grown up in the surroundings of the dockyard, Mathew was appointed 'Master Shipwright' in 1572. As John Hawkins's reformed naval administration began to bring discipline to the craft of shipbuilding, Mathew Baker became perhaps the greatest ship designer of Tudor times, known to have built, among other ships, the Dreadnought, the Vanguard, the Merhonour and the Repulse.

Advances in ship design

Known to dislike his rival Phineas Pett, Mathew Baker competed to become the chief engineer of Elizabeth I's navy. His success was achieved when he became the first known shipwright to develop the practice of 'laying down the lines' for a ship, not, as was traditional, at the site of construction, but on paper. Thus, scale models were no longer the only means of understanding the secret lore of the shipwright and it became possible to discuss and modify the plans with the patron.

Few shipbuilding treatises survive from the fifteenth century, and all these are Italian. Mathew Baker authored the earliest detailed English treatise on ship design.

Peter Pett I and Mathew Baker were both at Deptford when a new design of oceanic type of warship was launched in 1575. Revenge represented a departure from anything designed before. This was the origin of the 'Sailing Ship of the Line', the design that heralded the future British mastery of the seas. Revenge, while not a giant at 500 tons, was fast and dangerous. Heavily armed, its chief advantage was that it could remain at sea for long periods and was easily manoeuvrable against an aggressor.

Rivalry with the Pett dynasty
There is reason to believe that Mathew Baker may have been raised in the household of Peter Pett, who was associated from 1570 with the shipworks at Dover. The son of Peter Pett, Phineas, and his son, Peter, both endured the ill will of those in the boat building fraternity who, spurred by jealousy, wished to see the Pett shipwright dynasty fall. Mathew Baker and Phineas Pett quarrelled and, according to Pett, over the next ten to twelve years, Baker lost no opportunity of 'doing him a bad turn'. This seems to be borne out by Baker's own comments. 
 
Phineas Pett, a free radical among the established Master Shipwrights, took the bold initiative of sweeping aside Mathew Baker's grand principles of 'Shipwrightry'. The other shipwrights saw him as a dangerous upstart and made several unsuccessful attempts to thwart his advancement. However, Phineas Pett eventually became the subject of an enquiry in 1621 so serious that King James was forced to intervene. Stern criticism had been levelled against Pett by members of the Navy Commission, led by Burrell. At the behest of Mathew Baker, a party of 'diverse Master Shipwrights' of the Thames complained that Pett, amongst other outrages, was found employing the practice of 'furring' to broaden the width of the Prince Royal. They alleged he had misjudged the calculated width under Baker's system.  He had, in fact, introduced modifications into the methods of Baker and the older shipwrights, such as his adjustments of the width of the floor and the shape of the bows.

Perrin, in his introduction to Pett's autobiography, explains that "this indictment cannot be lightly set aside. Mathew Baker was the most prominent shipbuilder of that day, Bright and Richard Meryett (or Meritt) were Government Shipbuilders of long experience, while Nicholas Clay, John Greaves and Edward Stevens were private builders of considerable standing in their profession." These men sided with Baker on who was competent to undertake the refit of the Prince Royal built under Pett. Pett's own reference to this matter in his autobiography is "touching the cross-grained timber, his Majesty protested very earnestly the cross grain was in the men and not in the timber!".

Thus, having "maliciously certified the ship unserviceable and not fit to be continued [by] the 24th of February succeeding, by special command from His Majesty, who well understood their malicious proceedings, the selfsame surveyors were again sent to Chatham and under their hands certified that the ship might be made serviceable for a voyage into Spain with the charge of £300/~ to be bestowed upon her hull and the perfecting her masts, which certificate was returned under their hands and delivered to His Majesty." The Prince Royal was brought to the docks at Chatham on 8 March 1623 and re-launched a fortnight later.

References

Baker, Mathew
1530 births
1613 deaths
16th-century English people
17th-century English people